National Highway 316A, commonly referred to as NH 316A is a national highway in India. It is a spur road of National Highway 16.  NH-316A traverses the states of Odisha and West Bengal in India.

Route 
Odisha
Konark, Ratanpur, Satabhaya, Dhamra, Basudevpur, Talapada, Chandipur, Chandaneswar - West Bengal border.

A new link from NH-16 (Bhadrak) to Chandabali

West Bengal
Odisha border - Digha

Junctions  
 
  Terminal near Konark.
  Terminal near Digha.

See also 
 List of National Highways in India
 List of National Highways in India by state

References

External links 

National highways in India
National Highways in Odisha
National Highways in West Bengal